Mike Moore is a former American football coach. He served as the head football coach at Bethel College in North Newton, Kansas from 1999 to 2009, compiling a record of 47–51. 

Moore played junior college football at Dodge City Community College in Dodge City, Kansas and college football at Kansas State University, lettering for the Wildcats in 1990. He began his coaching career as an assistant McPherson High School in McPherson, Kansas and spent a year as an assistant at the University of Nebraska Omaha before he was hired in 1997 at Bethel as assistant head coach and defensive coordinator. Moore was appointed Bethel's interim head coach after George Papageorgiou resigned during the 1999 season.

Moore was twice named Kansas Collegiate Athletic Conference (KCAC) Coach of the Year, in 2000 and 2006. He led the Bethel Threshers to the program's first NAIA Football National Championship berth in 2006. In 2016, Moore was hired as assistant head coach and defensive coordinator at Newton High School in Newton, Kansas to assist head coach Chris Jaax.

Head coaching record

Notes

References

Year of birth missing (living people)
Living people
American football safeties
Bethel Threshers football coaches
Dodge City Conquistadors football players
Kansas State Wildcats football players
Nebraska–Omaha Mavericks football coaches
High school football coaches in Kansas